Albert Wolff (July 13, 1906 – June 14, 1989) was an American Olympic foil and épée fencer. Wolff was born in Barr, Bas-Rhin, France, and was Jewish. He later lived in Louisville, Kentucky, in the United States.

Biography
Wolff qualified for the French Olympic Team but boycotted the 1936 Summer Olympics in Berlin, Germany, withdrawing from France's national team on principle because he was a Jew. He said: "I cannot participate in anything sponsored by Adolf Hitler, even for France."

He fought in the French Army during World War II, and was awarded the Croix de Guerre by France for bravery during fierce fighting on the Maginot Line. The Germans captured him and put him in a Jewish war camp. Wolff escaped, and made it to Portugal, and then to the United States in 1941. He joined the US Army, and returned to Europe, fighting the Germans.

After the war was over, he petitioned the Amateur Fencers League of America (AFLA) to allow him to fence in the US National Fencing Championships. He was AFLA individual national épée champion in 1946.

He competed for the United States at the age of 42 in the 1948 Summer Olympics in London in individual and team épée, and at the age of 46 in the  1952 Summer Olympics in Helsinki in team épée. His fencing club was the Louisville Fencers.

In 1948, he was Athlete of the Year in Kentucky. He won a gold medal in team foil, and a silver medal in team épée, at the 1951 Pan American Games.

Wolff died at the age of 82 in Scottsdale, Arizona.

See also
 List of USFA Division I National Champions

References

External links
 

1906 births
1989 deaths
People from Barr, Bas-Rhin
People from Louisville, Kentucky
People from Alsace-Lorraine
American male foil fencers
American male épée fencers
Olympic fencers of the United States
1936 Summer Olympics
Fencers at the 1948 Summer Olympics
Fencers at the 1952 Summer Olympics
Pan American Games medalists in fencing
Pan American Games gold medalists for the United States
Pan American Games silver medalists for the United States
Fencers at the 1951 Pan American Games
French Army soldiers
Recipients of the Croix de Guerre 1939–1945 (France)
United States Army personnel of World War II
Jewish American sportspeople
Jewish male épée fencers
Jewish male foil fencers
Jewish military personnel
Jewish French sportspeople
20th-century American Jews
French emigrants to the United States
Sportspeople from Bas-Rhin
Medalists at the 1951 Pan American Games